Irakleotes is a municipal unit of the Grevena municipality. Before the 2011 local government reform, it was an independent municipality. The seat of the municipality was in Agios Georgios. The 2011 census recorded 1,890 residents in the municipal unit. Irakleotes covers an area of 136.631 km2.

Population
According to the 2011 census, the population of Irakleotes was 1,890 people, a decrease of almost 39% compared to the previous census of 2001.

References

Populated places in Grevena (regional unit)
Former municipalities in Western Macedonia